Petrelaea is a small genus of butterfly in the family Lycaenidae. Its species are found in the Australasian and Indomalayan realms.

Species
Petrelaea dana (de Nicéville, 1884)
Petrelaea tombugensis  (Röber, 1886) New Guinea, Celebes, Thursday Island, Sulawesi, Sula, Solomon Islands, North Australia, Ogasawara Island.

External links

 Funet Taxonomy Distribution
Images representing Petrelaea  at Bold

Polyommatini
Lycaenidae genera
Taxa named by Lambertus Johannes Toxopeus